James McGuire VC (1827 – 22 December 1862) was an Irish recipient of the Victoria Cross, the highest award for gallantry in the face of the enemy that can be awarded to British and Commonwealth forces. The V.C. was later forfeited.

Details
He was about 30 years old, and a sergeant in the 1st Bengal European Fusiliers (later The Royal Munster Fusiliers), Bengal Army during the Indian Mutiny when the following deed took place on 14 September 1857 at Delhi, India for which he together with Drummer Miles Ryan were awarded the VC:

Further information
One of eight men whose VCs were forfeited. McGuire's VC was forfeited after he was convicted of stealing a cow. He died in Derry, Ireland, 22 December 1862.

Medal's location
His Victoria Cross is displayed at the National Army Museum (Chelsea, England).

See also
The Register of the Victoria Cross (1981, 1988 and 1997)

References

Further reading

—; 
 
—Co. Fermanagh, Northern Ireland

Irish recipients of the Victoria Cross
Victoria Cross forfeitures
1827 births
1862 deaths
19th-century Irish people
Irish soldiers in the British East India Company Army
People from Enniskillen
Indian Rebellion of 1857 recipients of the Victoria Cross
British Army personnel of the Second Anglo-Burmese War
Military personnel from County Fermanagh